Jacob Hübner (20 June 1761 – 13 September 1826, in Augsburg) was a German entomologist. He was the author of Sammlung Europäischer Schmetterlinge (1796–1805), a founding work of entomology.

Scientific career
Hübner was the author of Sammlung Europäischer Schmetterlinge (1796–1805), a founding work of entomology. He was one of the first specialists to work on the European Lepidoptera. He described many new species, for example Sesia bembeciformis and Euchloe tagis, many of them common. He also described many new genera.

He was a designer and engraver and from 1786 he worked for three years as a designer and engraver at a cotton factory in Ukraine. There he collected butterflies and moths including descriptions and illustrations of some in Beiträge zur Geschichte der Schmetterlinge (1786–1790) along with other new species from the countryside around his home in Augsburg.

Hübner's masterwork "Tentamen" was intended as a discussion document. Inadvertently published, it led to subsequent confusion in classification. His publications were issued in sections, some after his death, often without associated publication dates. Arthur Francis Hemming, secretary of the International Commission on Zoological Nomenclature, summarized all the citations of Hübner's proposed taxonomic names, thereby constraining the possible dates of publication leading to the acceptance of Hübner's  works as valid taxonomic publications.

Works

 1786–1790: Beiträge zur Geschichte der Schmetterlinge ["Contributions to the history of butterflies"], Augsburg
 1793: Sammlung auserlesener Vögel und Schmetterlinge, mit ihren Namen herausgegeben auf hundert nach der Natur ausgemalten Kupfern ["Collection of choice birds and butterflies, issued with included names on 100 naturally colored copperplate prints"]
 1796–1805: Sammlung Europäischer Schmetterlinge ["Collection of European butterflies"]
 1806: Tentamen determinationis, digestionis atque denominationis singularum singularum stirpium Lepidopterorum, peritis ad inspiciendum et dijudicandum communicatum ["Preliminary examination, an attempt to fix, arrange and name the individual races of Lepidoptera to experts for examination and the expression of an opinion"]
 1806–1824: Geschichte europäischer Schmetterlinge ["History of European butterflies"]
 1806–1834 (with C. Geyer and G.A.W. Herrich-Schäffer): Sammlung exotischer Schmetterlinge ["Collection of exotic butterflies"] (2 vols.), Augsburg
 1816: Verzeichnis bekannter Schmetterlinge ["Directory of known butterflies"], Augsburg.
 1822: Systematisch-alphabetisches Verzeichnis aller bisher bey den Fürbildungen zur Sammlung europäischer Schmetterlinge angegebenen Gattungsbenennungen ["Systematic-alphabetic directory of all genus names hitherto issued with the depictions of European butterflies"]. Augsburg: published by the author.

References
Francis Hemming. Hübner: A bibliographical and systematic account of the entomological works of Jacob Hübner, and of the supplements thereto by Carl Geyer , Gottfried Franz von Frölich, and Gottlieb August Wilhelm Herrich-Schäffer. London: Royal Entomological Society of London, 1937. 2 volumes.

Bibliography
 (Essays on Jacob Hübner, Gottlieb Tobias Wilhelm, Christian Friedrich Freyer, Johann Friedrich Leu, Jakob Friedrich Caflisch and Andreas Wiedemann)
Calhoun, J. V. (2018). John Abbot, Jacob Hübner, and Oreas helicta (Nymphalidae: Satyridae). News of the Lepidopterists' Society. 60:159–163.

External links

Biolib Stueber Scans of Nachtschmetterlinge
 taxa described by Jacob Hübner at  Encyclopedia of Life Type Hubner into the search box
"ITIS" Taxon authors Hübner for another list
Jacob Hübner Works by Jacob Hübner at Biodiversity Heritage Library

German lepidopterists
1761 births
1826 deaths
German taxonomists
18th-century German zoologists
19th-century German zoologists
18th-century German writers
18th-century German male writers
19th-century German writers
19th-century German male writers